Osinsky District is the name of several administrative and municipal districts in Russia:
Osinsky District, Irkutsk Oblast, an administrative and municipal district of Irkutsk Oblast
Osinsky District, Perm Krai, an administrative and municipal district of Perm Krai

See also
Osinsky (disambiguation)

References